Antonio Rubén Párraga Ortiz (born 2 September 1984 in Málaga, Andalusia) is a Spanish retired footballer who played as a left back.

External links

1984 births
Living people
Footballers from Málaga
Spanish footballers
Association football defenders
Segunda División players
Segunda División B players
Atlético Malagueño players
Córdoba CF players
Granada CF footballers
Real Murcia players
SD Huesca footballers
Udinese Calcio players